Pectinina is a taxonomic grouping of saltwater clams, a suborder within the order Pectinida of marine bivalve molluscs.

References

Bivalve taxonomy
Mollusc suborders
Obsolete animal taxa